The Ateneo Veneto di Scienze, Lettere ed Arti is an  institution for the promulgation of science, literature, art and culture in all forms, in the exclusive interest of promoting social solidarity, located in Venice, northern Italy. The Ateneo Veneto is made up of 300 members resident in the city and in the province of Venice, elected by the Assembly, which is also responsible for appointing the Chairman and the Academic Council. Honorary, Non-Resident and Foreign Members, elected by the Assembly also participate in the life of the Ateneo.

The Ateneo Veneto was formed on 12 January 1812 through the merger of the Società Veneta di Medicina, the Accademia dei Filareti, and the Accademia Veneta Letteraria pursuant to a decree of Napoleon I dated 25 December 1810. The first chairman was Leopoldo Cicognara.

It was the Ateneo Veneto that saw the first stirrings of Venetian liberalism, with speeches by Daniele Manin, who was President of the short-lived Republic of San Marco from 1848 to 1849, and by Niccolò Tommaseo. Throughout the 19th and 20th centuries the Ateneo Veneto acted as a forum for debates on crucial matters for the city in the fields of culture, science, art, literature, medicine, politics, economics and law. Such free discussions on major issues have continued to characterize the Ateneo Veneto, testifying to its civic, social and cultural commitment.

History

Originally the building hosted a confraternity, the Scuola  di San Fantin, also known as the Scuola di San Girolamo or Scuola di Santa Maria e di San Girolamo (devoted to justice), as stated in the official documents of the Venetian Republic, more commonly referred to as "di San Fantin" or "dei picai" ("of the hanged men"). During the sixteenth century a number of great architects, painters and sculptors of the Baroque and Mannerist schools embarked upon a major reconstruction of the Scuola; by the beginning of the seventeenth century the building was more or less as one sees it now. The church on the ground-floor is now the conference-hall. The albergo, on the first floor, is a reading-room: around 1664 the albergo piccolo was added (now the "Sala Tommaseo"), as was the new sacristy on the ground floor (now a meeting-room). On the top floor is the library which contains around 40,000 volumes, some of them of inestimable historic and artistic value. The art-collection, with works by Tintoretto, Veronese, Palma il Giovane, Antonio Zanchi, Francesco Fontebasso, Pietro Longhi and Alessandro Vittoria, is also extremely valuable.

The Ateneo Veneto, a non-profit organization, institution of science, literature and arts, is committed to making full use of its historical and artistic heritage (the building, art-collection and library) and to the pursuit of cultural activities (scholarly studies, courses in history, science, literature and art, lectures, conferences, theatrical, musical and cinematic events, exhibitions and the Torta Prize for restoration) and social initiatives (hosting local associations and committees without their own premises, collaborating with the institutions of the city, co-organizing University courses for senior citizens held at the Ateneo Veneto, contributing to the cultural education of young students and scholars through subsidized training-courses in the library and the Ateneo Veneto, and co-operating with the city's cultural organizations). It will continue to expand its services, including recreational activities connected with the above-mentioned initiatives, using the Internet and multi-media facilities.

Presidents

1811–1817 Leopoldo Cicognara
1817–1822 Francesco Aglietti
1822–1826 Carlo Antonio Gambara
1826–1832 Carlo Pietro Biaggi
1832–1842 Leonardo Manin
1842–1845 Daniele Renier
1845–1848 Leonardo Manin
1848–1851 Andrea Giovannelli
1851–1853 Bartolomeo Bizio
1853–1857 Giovanni Querini Stampalia
1857–1860 Alvise Francesco Mocenigo
1860–1862 Gerolamo Dandolo
1862–1865 Antonio Berti
1865–1868 Giacinto Namias
1868–1869 Giovanni Minotto
1869–1872 Giuseppe Calucci
1872–1876 Giuseppe Maria Malvezzi
1876–1882 Demetrio Busoni
1882–1886 Domenico Giuriati
1886–1890 Paulo Fambri
1890–1891 Angelo Minich
1891–1896 Paulo Fambri
1896–1898 Marco Diena
1898–1902 Ajessandro Pascolato
1902–1907 Filippo Nani Mocenigo
1907–1911 Luigi Carlo Stivanello
1911–1915 Filippo Nani Mocenigo
1915–1919 Ferruccio Truffi
1919–1921 Davide Giordano
1921–1925 Giuseppe Jona
1925–1929 Davide Giordano
1929–1933 Giovanni Bordiga
1934–1938 Luigi Marangoni
1938–1942 Davide Giordano
1942–1947 Carlo Alberto Dell'Agnola
1947–1951 Ernesto Pietriboni
1951–1955 Antonio Romani
1955–1958 Arturo Pompeati
1958–1963 Giacomo Giorgio Tosoni Gradenigo
1963–1967 Enzo Milner
1967–1971 Sandro Marconi
1971–1975 Pietro Zampetti
1975–1979 Giuseppe La Monaca
1979–1983 Sergio Perosa
1983–1988 Alessandro Bettagno
1988–1993 Cartlo Rubbia
1993–1996 Giovanni Castellani
1996–2001 Giannantonio Paladini
2001–2005 Alfredo Bianchini
2005–2009 Antonio Alberto Semi
2009–2013 Michele Gottardi
2013 (incumbent) Guido Vittorio Zucconi

References

External links 
 

Non-profit organisations based in Italy
Organizations established in 1812
Culture in Venice
Buildings and structures in Venice
Learned societies of Italy
1812 establishments in the Kingdom of Italy (Napoleonic)